Gwadar (Balochi/, IPA: [gəʋɑːd̪əɾ]) is a port city with  located on the southwestern coast of Balochistan, Pakistan. The city is located on the shores of the Arabian Sea opposite Oman. Gwadar is the 100th largest city of Pakistan, according to the 2017 census. It was an overseas possession of Oman from 1783 to 1958. On 2 April 2021, Gwadar was declared the capital of the South Balochistan region.

The main industrial concern is a fish-processing factory. Gwadar became part of the sultanate of Muscat and Oman in 1797, and it was not until 1958 that the town and adjoining hinterland were exchanged from Oman to Pakistan.

Gwadar came in the focus of attention after the Kargil War when Pakistan felt the need of having a military naval port and the Karachi-Gwadar Road (Coastal Highway) was built for defence purpose. For most of its history, Gwadar was a small to medium-sized settlement with an economy largely based on artisanal fishing. The strategic value of its location was first recognized in 1954 when it was identified as a suitable site for a deep water port by the United States Geological Survey at the request of Pakistan while the territory was still under Omani rule. The area's potential to be a major deep water port remained untapped under successive Pakistani governments until 2001, when construction on the first phase of Gwadar Port was initiated. The first phase was inaugurated in 2007 at a total cost of $248 million. The port initially remained underutilized after construction for a variety of reasons, including lack of investment, security concerns, and the Government of Pakistan's failure to transfer land as promised to the port operator, Port of Singapore Authority.

In April 2015, Pakistan and China announced their intention to develop the $46 billion China–Pakistan Economic Corridor (CPEC), which in turn forms part of China's ambitious One Belt, One Road. Gwadar features heavily in CPEC, and is also envisaged to be the link between the One Belt, One Road and Maritime Silk Road project. $1.153 billion worth of infrastructure projects will be invested into the city as part of CPEC, with the aim of linking northern Pakistan and western China to the deep water seaport. The city will also be the site of a floating liquefied natural gas facility that will be built as part of the larger $2.5 billion Gwadar–Nawabshah segment of the Iran–Pakistan gas pipeline project. In addition to investments directly under the aegis of CPEC in Gwadar city, the China Overseas Port Holding Company in June 2016 began construction on the $2 billion Gwadar Special Economic Zone, which is being modelled on the lines of the special economic zones of China. In September 2016 the Gwadar Development Authority published a request for tenders for the preparation of expropriation and resettlement of Old Town Gwadar.

Etymology 
The word "Gwadar" is a combination of two Balochi words – guad meaning wind and dar meaning gateway or door, thus Gwadar means "the gate of wind".

History

Ancient 
The inhabitation of Gwadar, like most areas of Balochistan, appears to be ancient. The area shows inhabitation as early as the Bronze Age with settlements around some of the area's oasis. It is from this settlement pattern that the word Makran, the original name of Balochistan, is derived. For a period, it was a region of the Achaemenid Persian Empire. It is believed to have been conquered by the founder of the Persian Empire, Cyrus the Great. The capital of the satrapy of Gedrosia was Pura, which is thought to have been located near the modern Bampūr, in Iranian Balochistan. During the homeward march of Alexander the Great, his admiral, Nearchus, led a fleet along the modern-day Makran coast and recorded that the area was dry, mountainous, and inhabited by the "Ichthyophagoi" (or "fish-eaters"), an ancient Greek rendering of the ancient Persian phrase "Mahi Khorana," which has itself become the modern word "Makran". After the collapse of Alexander's empire the area was ruled by Seleucus Nicator, one of Alexander's generals. The region then came under Mauryan rule around 303 BCE, after Seleucus made peace with Emperor Chandragupta and ceded the territory to the Mauryans.

Omani rule 

The region remained on the sidelines of history for a millennium until the Arab-Muslim army captured Makran in CE 643 and over the intervening (and nearly equivalent) amount of time the area was contested by various powers. This was then followed by almost two centuries of local rule by the various Baloch tribes. The city was visited by Ottoman Admiral Seydi Ali Reis in the 1550s and mentioned in his book Mirat ul Memalik (The Mirror of Countries), 1557. According to Seydi Ali Reis, the inhabitants of Gwadar were Baloch and their chief was Malik Jelaleddin, son of Malik Dinar.

In the 15th century the Portuguese conquered parts of India and Oman. They planned to proceed with annexation of the coastal area of Makran. They attacked Gwadar under the leadership of Vasco de Gama, but under the supervision of Commander Mir Ismaheel Baloch, the Portuguese were defeated by the Baloch. A few times the Portuguese looted and set the coastal villages on fire, but they failed to capture Gwadar. Cannons of the Portuguese army were found lying near the Central Jail of Gwadar. The grave of Mir Ismaheel Baloch is situated near the Mountain of Batal Gwadar, constructed by Mir Ismaheel Baloch himself during life. He died in 873 Hijri, heirless.
By the end of the 16th century, Mughal Emperor Akbar the Great conquered the city along with all of Balochistan after the Battle of Sehwan. It remained under Mughal control until early 18th century.

Towards the end of the 18th century, the Khan of Kalat, Mir Noori Naseer Khan Baloch, granted suzerainty over Gwadar to Said bin Ahmad, the ruler of Muscat. When the sultan subsequently retook Muscat, he was to continue his rule in Gwadar by appointing a wali (or "governor"). This wali was then ordered to subjugate the nearby coastal town of Chabahar (now in Iran). The Gwadar fort was built during Omani rule. In the middle of the 18th century, Mir Noori Naseer Khan Baloch captured Gwadar and its surrounding areas after defeating the Gichki Baloch tribe and included it in the Kalat Khanate. However, realizing that maintaining control of the area will be difficult without the support of the Gichkis, Mir Nasir entered into an agreement with the local Gichki Chief, which allowed the Gichkis to maintain administrative control of the area, in return for furnishing half the collected revenues to Kalat, this arrangement continued till 1783. When Saiad Sultan fell out with his brother, the ruler of Muscat, and asked for help, Mir Noori Naseer Khan handed over Gwadar, as part of his share of revenues, to Saiad Sultan for his maintenance with the understanding that the area be returned to Kalat, when Saiad Sultan acquires the throne. Saiad Sultan ascended to the throne of Muscat in 1797 but never returned Gwadar enclave to Kalat. The ensuing struggle between the heirs of the Sultan and Khan of Kalat for possession of Gwadar, allowed the British to intervene. Telegraph lines were later extended into the town courtesy of the British.

The British after extracting concessions from the Sultan for the use of the area facilitated Muscat to retain Gwadar. Later on, the British claimed that the area was granted to the Sultan by Mir Nasir, however, local accounts and the declassified documents of that time challenge this claim. From 1863 to 1879 Gwadar was the headquarters of a British Assistant Political Agent. Gwadar was a fortnightly port of call for the British India Steamship Navigation Company's steamers and included a combined Post & Telegraph Office.

Pakistan 

Gwadar became part of Pakistan by negotiations led by Prime Minister of Pakistan Feroz Khan Noon and his wife Viqar-un-Nisa Noon with the Said bin Taimur, the Sultan of Oman. The Sultan of Oman agreed to hand Gwadar over to Pakistan for Rs. 5.5 billion, at the time equivalent to US$3 million, which was largely paid by Aga Khan IV.

In 1952, Makran acceded to the newly created Dominion of Pakistan and was made a district – but Gwadar at that time was not included in Makran. In 1958, Gwadar and its surrounding areas were transferred by Oman to Pakistan by the efforts of Prime Minister of Pakistan Feroz Khan Noon and his wife Viqar-un-Nisa Noon. It was given the status of a Tehsil of Makran district.  On 1 July 1977, Makran District was upgraded into a division and was divided into three districts of Turbat (Kech since 1994–95), Panjgur and Gwadar.

Gwadar underwent major development from 2002 to 2007. In 2002, Pakistan's National Highway Authority (NHA) began construction of the 653 km-long Makran Coastal Highway linking Gwadar with Karachi via Pasni and Ormara and onwards with the rest of the National Highways of Pakistan, which was completed in 2004. In 2003, the Gwadar Development Authority was established to oversee the planning and development of Gwadar and Gwadar Industrial Estate Development Authority was established to promote industrial activities in mega port city of Gwadar. In 2004, NHA began construction of the 820-km long M-8 motorway linking Gwadar with Ratodero in Sindh province via Turbat, Hoshab, Awaran, and Khuzdar and onwards with the rest of the Motorways of Pakistan. In 2006, the Gwadar Development Authority conceived, developed, and adopted a 50-year Master Plan for Gwadar, which was inspired by the Chinese port city of Shenzhen. In 2007, the Civil Aviation Authority of Pakistan acquired  to construct a new greenfield airport, the New Gwadar International Airport , at an estimated cost of US$246 million. It is expected to be operational by September 2023.

On 3 June 2022, Prime Minister Shehbaz Sharif inaugurated the 19.49 km, six-lane Gwadar East Bay Expressway, which was developed as an early harvest project under the China–Pakistan Economic Corridor. The expressway connects the Gwadar Port with the Makran Coastal Highway, thus improving connectivity and helping the transportation of goods towards Karachi. Other developments include 100MW Electricity import from Iran, multiple Housing Schemes, 5-star Hotels, Expo Centre, Desalination Plants on Arabian Sea, Pak-China Friendship Hospital, Aramco Oil Refinery (foreign investment from Saudi Arabia) and an ICC Standard Cricket Stadium.

Geography

Topography 

Gwadar is situated on the southwestern Arabian Sea coast of Pakistan in Gwadar District of Balochistan province. Like Ormara further east, Gwadar is situated on a natural hammerhead-shaped tombolo peninsula forming two almost perfect, but naturally curved, semicircular bays on either side. To the east of the isthmus is the deepwater Demi Zirr harbour, where the Gwadar Port was built.

Population 
As Gwadar was part of Sultanate of Oman during the British rule, it was excluded from all the censuses of British India. According to the records of Oman from 1945, the Gwadar city had a population of 5,875. The population of the city has risen to approximately 85,000 as of 2014. In the 2017 census, Gwadar city had a total population of 90,762. Currently in 2020 it is estimated to be 138,000.The population of Gwadar is predominantly Baloch.

Climate 

Gwadar has a hot desert climate (Köppen BWh), characterised by little precipitation and high variation between summer and winter temperatures. Oceanic influence from the cool currents of the Arabian Sea moderates temperatures, resulting in notably cooler summer temperatures compared to areas inland and cities in the Persian Gulf such as Dubai. The Arabian Sea also moderates winter temperatures, resulting in warmer winter nights as compared to inland areas.

The mean temperature in the hottest month (June) remains between 31 °C and 32 °C. The mean temperature in the coolest month (January) varies from 18 °C to 19 °C. The uniformity of temperature is a unique characteristic of the Makran Coastal region. Occasionally, winds moving down the Balochistan plateau bring brief cold spells, otherwise the winter is pleasant. In Gwadar, winters are shorter than summers. Although Gwadar is situated outside the monsoon belt, it receives light monsoon showers in summer (June–August). However, in winter, Western Disturbance can cause heavy rainfall. Annual rainfall is only 100 mm (3 inches).

Administration 
Gwadar serves as the headquarters for both the Gwadar District and Gwadar Tehsil. Gwadar Tehsil is administratively subdivided into five union councils.

On 2 April 2021, Gwadar was granted the title of capital of South Balochistan by the Balochistan government.

Neighbourhoods 
Gwadar is divided into 5 union councils, which are further subdivided into wards:

 Gwadar Central
Gazrawan
Komagri
Mohallah Zahoor Shah
Saleh Muhammad
Sohrabi
Usmania
 South Gwadar
Kamari
Mohallah Karim Bakhsh
Mohallah Shahdu Band
Mullah Band
Murad Bakhsh
Sarabi
Sheikh Umar
Tobagh
 North Gwadar
Lal Baksh
Mohalla Baloch
Mohalla Mir Abdul Ghafoor
Mujahid
 Pishukan
 Surbandar

Culture 

Gwadar's location and history have given it a unique blend of cultures. The Arabic influence upon Gwadar is strong as a consequence of the Omani era and its close proximity to the Arabian peninsula. Remnants of Oman era buildings can also be found in the city.

Strategic importance 
Central Asia and South Asia, encompassing the Caspian region, Central Asian republics, Afghanistan and Iran, and the energy-rich 'lake' called the Caspian Sea, is a significant region because of its huge monetary prospective and geographically vital positioning, which has formed the region as a centre piece in the international arena. Iran has also declared support for the development of Gwadar and its port.

Economy

Gwadar Free Zone 
The construction on a $20 billion 10-square kilometre tax exempt industrial zone began on 20 June 2016. The zone includes a 300MW coal powerplant exclusive for the industrial zone. Despite Chinese investment, much of this development, including the power plant, remains unfinished.

Gwadar Port 

The Chinese share of revenue generated from Gwadar Port would be 91% while Pakistan will get 9% share. China has a great strategic interest in Gwadar. In 2013, the state-owned China Overseas Port Holdings Limited acquired Gwadar Port. Gwadar will reduce the distance to a mere  and also operate year-round.

China is heavily dependent on Persian Gulf oil which passes through the Strait of Malacca all the way through the Indian and Pacific Oceans. Once the oil reaches China's east coast ports, it is transported thousands of kilometres inland to western China. The Gwadar port–Karakoram Highway (KKH) route is sometimes said to be safer, cheaper and shorter than transporting the oil by ocean tanker. However, research suggests that transporting oil by roadways from Gwadar to China would be very expensive, would encounter numerous logistical difficulties such as mountainous terrain, earthquakes, disputes with India, and potential terrorist attacks, and would barely make any impact on China's overall energy security, though Pakistan intends to build an oil pipeline to northern Pakistan that may allay much of these concerns.

Chinese goods flowing in the opposite direction may be able to find an easier, shorter and secure route to the Middle East. The city is also being developed as an export processing zone for foreign companies to manufacture in Gwadar before exporting to various countries in the region.

New Gwadar International Airport

Due to the Chinese interest in the Gwadar Port, Pakistan believes that Gwadar will become a regional hub. Prime Minister Imran Khan laid down the foundation stone for the New Gwadar International Airport (NGIAP) at Gwadar on 29 March 2019. The new airport will cater to domestic and international flights, and will have an open skies policy.

It will be a greenfield airport, with a cargo terminal handling capacity of 30,000 tonnes a year. The CAA Pakistan has awarded the design and construction contract to the China Communications Construction Company (CCCC), and the facilities are expected to be operational by September of 2023.

Twin towns and sister cities

Education
Literacy rate in Gwadar is estimated to be 25%. According to Pakistan District Education Rankings, a report by Alif Ailaan, district Gwadar is ranked nationally at 61, with a education score of 59.47 and learning score of 62.65. Enrollment levels are low in Gwadar because of fewer schools in the district. And the level of enrollment declines as we move up the classes.

The school infrastructure score of Gwadar is 29.91, giving it a national rank of 122. A mere thirty-three percent (33%) of all of the schools in the district are welcoming to girls; sixty-seven percent (67%) of district schools cater to boys, putting girls at a further disadvantage. Lack of supplies, inefficient student transportation options, lack of appropriate science equipment/labs, meager or nonexistent physical education facilities, and a lack of special education teachers are major concerns, regionally.

Overcrowding, resulting in overburdened teachers—some of whom instruct two classes simultaneously—a lack of sciences instructors and general lack of exercise/play/recess space are further issues faced by the students and school systems of Gwadar.

See also
 Gwadar Cricket Stadium
 Gwadar Fish Harbour

References

External links 
 Official website

Coastal cities and towns in Pakistan
Former exclaves
Gwadar District
Peninsulas of Pakistan
Port cities and towns in Pakistan
Planned cities in Pakistan
Proposed special economic zones
Purchased territories
Port cities and towns of the Arabian Sea
Oman–Pakistan relations